Hatiya Municipality is the largest municipality by area in Bangladesh. It is located in Hatiya Upazila and was established in 2005.

Administration
The municipality is subdivided into 3 mouzas, 9 wards and 23 mahallas.

Facilities
The municipality has around 52 mosques.

References

Municipalities of Bangladesh
2005 establishments in Bangladesh
Hatiya Upazila